Politico is Mexican Institute of Sound's fourth album. Released in August 2012, its theme is dedicated to Mexico's political and social environment; hence the name of the album.

Track listing 
 Político
 Especulando
 Revolución
 México
 Es-Toy
 Más!
 Ceci N'Est Pas Automate
 Se Baila Así
 My Buddy @Julps
 Tipo Raro
 Ritmo Internacional
 Cumbia Meguro
 El Jefe

References 

 
 

2012 albums
Mexican Institute of Sound albums